Neydhen Vakivaakah is a 2017 Maldivian romantic film directed by Mohamed Aboobakuru. Produced under ME Production, the film stars Jadhulla Ismail, Fathimath Azifa, and Yoosuf Shafeeu in pivotal roles. The film was released on 27 September 2017.

Premise
Aishath Zeena (Fathimath Azifa) is proposed by her fiancé, Nadheem (Ahmed Azmeel), but their happiness is short-lived since the latter is met with a fatal accident on his way back home. Depressed, she moves back to her homeland, where she meet a simple and diffident young man, Nizam (Jadhulla Ismail) who happens to visit her island, for a wedding reception of a friend. Soon after, a romantic relationship builds between them. However, Nizam has to abruptly leave to abroad to start his college education and an envious man interfere in their relationship. As Zeena tries to move on from her ill-fated relationships, she meets Shihan (Yoosuf Shafeeu), brother of Nizam.

Cast 
 Yoosuf Shafeeu as Shihan
 Jadhulla Ismail as Ahmed Nizam
 Fathimath Azifa as Aishath Zeena
 Ahmed Saeed as Imthiyaz
 Arifa Ibrahim as Shihan & Nizam's mother
 Ahmed Azmeel as Nadheem (special appearance)
 Nashidha Mohamed as Sheeza
 Aishath Junaina
 Ali Shahid as Areef
 Ibrahim Riyaz
 Ibrahim Naseer
 Zoya Rasheedh as Meera
 Zeenath
 Sanfa Ibrahim
 Maahi Mohamed
 Ismail Areef
 Zeeshan
 Maria Teresa Pagano as Cari (special appearance)

Soundtrack

Release and reception
The film was released on 27 September 2017. Upon release, the film received mixed reviews from critics. Mariyam Waheedha reviewing from Miadhu particularly praised the acting performance of Fathimath Azifa, Yoosuf Shafeeu and Arifa Ibrahim calling them "reliable" while she found Ismail's performance "good enough" for a debut.

References

2017 films
2017 romantic drama films
Maldivian romantic drama films

External links